Sven Markus Holgersson (born 16 April 1985) is a Swedish former professional footballer who played as a defender. He played professionally in Sweden, the United States, England, Cyprus, Denmark, and Spain before retiring in 2019. He won one cap for the Sweden national team.

Club career

Sweden
Having spent his youth years at Olympia, he returned to Helsingborg after a four-year spell at Helsingborg's feeder club Ängelholms FF. Upon returning to Helsinborg, Holgersson became an instant starter at right back. During the 2011 season Holgersson helped the club in becoming the first team in Swedish history to win a treble, consisting of Super Cup, League and Swedish Cup titles. On 2 January 2012 Helsingborg confirmed that Holgersson had rejected to renew his contract with the club.

United States
Holgersson was rumoured to be in talks with New York Red Bulls of Major League Soccer and on 3 January 2012 Red Bulls coach Hans Backe indicated that the player had agreed to join the club. On 12 January 2012, it was confirmed that Holgersson would be joining the Red Bulls. In his first year with New York Holgersson was an undisputed starter at centerback starting 31 games and scoring 3 goals. The following season Holgersson retained his starting position starting in 32 league matches as New York captured its first major title the MLS Supporters' Shield. Holgersson and the club agreed to part ways following the season.

Wigan Athletic
Holgersson joined Wigan Athletic on 5 February 2014 after being a free agent.

He was released from his contract at the end of the season after making only one appearance. After leaving Wigan, Holgersson went on trial with Championship side Huddersfield Town on trial and his performance in the friendly match left him impressed by Manager Mark Robins.

Later career
After leaving Wigan, Holgersson returned to Sweden by rejoining Helsingborgs IF until the end of the 2014 season. On 28 August 2014 he signed a two-year contract with Anorthosis of Cyprus.

On 14 April 2016 it was confirmed that Holgersson had signed a pre-contract with Danish Superliga-club, AaB, starting from the summer 2016. His contract was terminated on 12 July 2017.

On 14 July 2017, Holgersson signed for Spanish Segunda División side Lorca FC.

On 8 August 2018, Holgersson returned to Helsingborgs IF, now competing in Superettan, Sweden's second tier.

International career
After a successful 2011 season, Holgersson received his first call up to join Sweden for its friendly matches against Bahrain on 18 January 2012 and Qatar on 23 January 2012. He made his debut with Sweden on 23 January 2012 going the full 90 in a 5–0 victory over Qatar.

References

External links

Profile fotbolltransfers.com

1985 births
Living people
Footballers from Skåne County
Swedish footballers
Association football defenders
Allsvenskan players
Superettan players
Ängelholms FF players
Helsingborgs IF players
Major League Soccer players
New York Red Bulls players
English Football League players
Wigan Athletic F.C. players
Cypriot First Division players
Anorthosis Famagusta F.C. players
Danish Superliga players
AaB Fodbold players
Lorca FC players
Sweden international footballers
Swedish expatriate footballers
Swedish expatriate sportspeople in the United States
Swedish expatriate sportspeople in England
Swedish expatriate sportspeople in Cyprus
Swedish expatriate sportspeople in Denmark
Swedish expatriate sportspeople in Spain
Expatriate soccer players in the United States
Expatriate footballers in England
Expatriate footballers in Cyprus
Expatriate men's footballers in Denmark
Expatriate footballers in Spain
Segunda División players